John the Iberian (died ) was a Georgian monk, who is venerated as a saint. His name refers to his origins from the Kingdom of the Iberians.

Life
A member of a Georgian noble family from Tao-Klarjeti in southern Georgia, he was married and served as a military commander.

After becoming tonsured as a monk early 960s at the lavra of the Four Churches in Tao-Klarjeti, he became a monk at Mount Olympus (now Uludağ) in Bithynia and then traveled to Constantinople to rescue his son, Euthymius the Illuminator (Euthymius Opplyseren). Euthymius had been held as a hostage by the emperor.

John and his son attracted many followers, so they both retired to the monastery of Saint Athanasius on Mount Athos.  They founded Iviron monastery with the help of John’s brother-in-law, John Thornikos, a retired general.  John served as the first abbot of Iviron. He died in 1002.

References

Bibliography 
Butler, A. (1995) Butler's Lives of the Saints, Volume 7, Liturgical Press

External links
Saint John the Georgian
St. John the Iberian

1000s deaths
Athonite Fathers
Saints of Georgia (country)
Christian monks from Georgia (country)
10th-century Christian saints
Byzantine people of Georgian descent
10th-century Byzantine monks
10th-century people from Georgia (country)
11th-century people from Georgia (country)
Year of birth unknown
Calligraphers from Georgia (country)
Founders of Christian monasteries
People associated with Great Lavra
People associated with Iviron Monastery